The Men's pursuit event of the Biathlon World Championships 2016 was held on 6 March 2016. The fastest 60 athletes of the sprint competition participated over a course of 12.5 km.

Results
The race was started at 13:30 CET.

References

Men's pursuit